General Casimir Pulaski is a bronze equestrian statue, by Kazimierz Chodziński (the architect Albert P. Ross). It is located at Freedom Plaza, 13th Street and Pennsylvania Avenue, Northwest, Washington, D.C.

It shows a mounted figure of General Casimir Pulaski. It was authorized on February 27, 1903, and dedicated on May 11, 1910.

Inscriptions
The inscriptions read:

Base, Left Side:
Brandy Wine
Valley Forge
Egg Harbor
(Base, Back Rounded End:)
Brigadier General US
Marshal General Poland

Base, Right Side:
Charlestown
Savannah
Germantown

Base, Front Rounded End:
Brigadier General
Casimir Pulaski
1741–1779
Fell in Battle at Savannah

Base Plaque:
Brigadier General
Casimir Pulaski
1748-1779
The Bronze Equestrian Statue of 
Brigadier General Casimir Pulaski,
Portrays the Revolutionary War Hero In
The Uniform of a Polish Cavalry Commander.
Born in Wniary, Poland on March 4, 1748
To a Noble Family, Pulaski Gained 
Prominence in Europe for His Role In
Defending Liberty in Poland. Excited By
The Struggle of the Emerging American 
Republic, Pulaski Joined in Its Fight
For Independence, Arriving in Boston
In July, 1777.
Pulaski Was given a Commission As
Brigadier General and Chief of Cavalry
In Command of All Cavalry of the American
Forces. He Was Present at Germantown, 
Pennsylvania and Led His Legion At
Haddonfield, New Jersey; Egg Harbor,
New Jersey; Charleston, South Carolina;
And Savannah, Georgia.
At Savannah, Pulaski Was Mortally
Wounded and Was Taken Aboard The
American Brig, Wasp, Where He Died And
Was Buried at Sea, on October 11, 1779.
He Was 31 Years Old.
The Statue Was Designed by The
Sculptor Kazimierz Chodzinski And
Architect Albert R. Ross. It Was
Erected in 1910.

As part of American Revolution Statuary in Washington, D.C. the statue is listed on the National Register of Historic Places.

See also
 List of public art in Washington, D.C., Ward 6

References

External links
 

1910 sculptures
Pulaski
Bronze sculptures in Washington, D.C.
Equestrian statues in Washington, D.C.
Historic district contributing properties in Washington, D.C.
Monuments and memorials to Casimir Pulaski
Federal Triangle
Cultural depictions of Casimir Pulaski